Bloomsburg is a town and the county seat of Columbia County, Pennsylvania, United States. It is the only Pennsylvania municipality incorporated as a town. As of the 2010 census, Bloomsburg had a population of 14,855, with an estimated population of 13,811 in 2019.

Bloomsburg is one of two principal communities of the Bloomsburg-Berwick, PA Metropolitan Statistical Area, a metropolitan area that covers Columbia and Montour counties, and had a combined population of 85,562 at the 2010 census.

History

The first signs of European settlement date to the year 1772, when James McClure established a log cabin in the area. Until the mid-19th century, it was just a small village, known as Bloom Township. Traditionally, Bloomsburg's founding in 1802 has been ascribed to settler Ludwig Eyer, son of Johann Martin Eyer, acting as agent for his brother Johann Adam. For 75 years after the discovery of ore in the area, Bloomsburg developed a booming iron industry.

Since its incorporation on March 4, 1870, Bloomsburg has held the distinction of being the only town in Pennsylvania. While some home rule municipalities may be styled as towns in their charters, they remain classified as either cities, boroughs, or townships. One particular point of confusion regards McCandless Township, Allegheny County, Pennsylvania, which remains a township despite taking the name "Town of McCandless" when adopting a home rule charter in 1975. Bloomsburg's slogan of "The only incorporated town in Pennsylvania" reflects its unique status.

The Bloomsburg Historic District and Rupert Covered Bridge No. 56 are listed on the National Register of Historic Places.

On 28 October 2015, a North American Aerospace Defense Command (NORAD) blimp broke free from Aberdeen Proving Ground and headed north, taking out the town's power supply as it went.

Geography

Bloomsburg is located west of the center of Columbia County, along the north bank of the Susquehanna River and on the east side of Fishing Creek. The southern half of the town occupies level ground along the Susquehanna, while the northern half is occupied by  Turkey Hill. The campus of Bloomsburg University of Pennsylvania occupies a large portion of the hill.

Neighboring municipalities
Mount Pleasant Township (north)
Scott Township (east)
Catawissa Township (south, separated by the Susquehanna River)
Montour Township (southwest)
Hemlock Township (west)

Climate
The month with the least precipitation is February, which has  on average. June experiences the most precipitation:  on average.

Demographics

As of the census of 2010, there were 14,855 people residing in the town. There were 5,121 housing units. The racial makeup of the town was 89.6% White, 6.2% African American, 0.10% Native American, 1.6% Asian, 0.04% Pacific Islander and 1.4% from two or more races. Hispanic or Latino of any race were 3.4% of the population.

According to the 2000 census There were 4,080 households, out of which 19.7% had children under the age of 18 living with them, 31.2% were married couples living together, 9.7% had a female householder with no husband present, and 56.1% were non-families.  35.6% of all households were made up of individuals, and 12.6% had someone living alone who was 65 years of age or older. The average household size was 2.30 and the average family size was 2.83.

In the town, the population was spread out, with 12.3% under the age of 18, 45.5% from 18 to 24, 18.6% from 25 to 44, 12.7% from 45 to 64, and 11.0% who were 65 years of age or older. The median age was 22 years. For every 100 females, there were 77.5 males. For every 100 females age 18 and over, there were 74.7 males.

The median income for a household in the town was $24,868, and the median income for a family was $39,806. Males had a median income of $29,940 versus $19,961 for females. The per capita income for the town was $12,819. About 10.5% of families and 31.2% of the population were below the poverty line, including 19.8% of those under age 18 and 15.2% of those age 65 or over.

Government

The town of Bloomsburg is administered by a town council of six members and the mayor. As an incorporated town, the mayor can vote along with the council on every motion. This is different from most borough councils, where there are seven council members and the mayor can only vote to break ties.

Education
Bloomsburg is served by the Bloomsburg Area School District, which has about 1,800 students enrolled from the town itself, western, and southeastern suburbs.

Columbia-Montour Area Vocational-Technical School in Bloomsburg has numerous secondary education trade programs.

The Central Columbia School District has approximately 2,100 students and encompasses the eastern and northern suburbs of Bloomsburg.

Bloomsburg University, one of the 14 institutions in the Pennsylvania State System of Higher Education, had a 2012 enrollment of 10,000 full-time undergraduate and 846 graduate students.

Additionally, there are several private religious and non-denominational schools in and around the immediate vicinity of Bloomsburg.

Recreation
The one park in Bloomsburg is the  Town Park, established in 1927. The Norris E. Rock Memorial Swimming Pool and the Bloomsburg Skate Park immediately adjoin the park. The town has also purchased the former Streater Farm at the confluence of Fishing Creek and the Susquehanna River, which is being converted into athletic fields, a nature preserve, and a walking path that will be tied in with the existing Columbia-Montour Rails-to-Trails program.

Notable businesses

On May 31, 2009, Bloomsburg Mills, Inc., after 120 years of weaving and finishing fabrics in Bloomsburg, went out of business, closing both a local plant and a dye plant in Monroe, North Carolina. The closure affected over 200 employees in both locations.

In early 2014 Windsor Foods (formerly Del Monte Foods) closed their doors, affecting more than 160 employees. Company officials cited flooding as a result of Tropical Storm Lee as one of their reasons for the plant closing.

Culture

Bloomsburg is home to the Bloomsburg Theatre Ensemble, founded in 1978 to establish a resident professional ensemble for the production of quality entertainment and educational programs for the region, and to promote the arts.

The Bloomsburg Public Library was founded in 1899 and funded jointly by the taxpayers of Bloomsburg, Scott Township, and Hemlock Township.

Bloomsburg is also home to the Bloomsburg Fair (the largest fair in the state of Pennsylvania) which, since 1855, is a traditional agricultural fair .

The David Stroup Fountain, erected in 1892, is located at Bloomsburg's Market Square. David Stroup was the owner of a local candy shop who left money in his will to the town's water works. The current fountain is a restored version of the original, which was dismantled in 1966 due to its deterioration but was put back together in 1982 by Daniel and Michael McCloskey. The original crane sculpture, which was at the top of the fountain, was lost in storage until 2005, when it was cleaned, repaired, and replaced on the fountain.

The Children's Museum is at 2 West Seventh Street.

Local media
Bloomsburg is home to one daily newspaper, the Press Enterprise. Bloomsburg has two online news sites: The Bloomsburg News covering all of Bloomsburg activities, and  BloomUtoday.com covering Bloomsburg University as well as local news. The Voice, Bloomsburg University's student newspaper and BUnow, the campus's online, student-run newspaper, cover university-related and more traditional world and entertainment news.

Several radio stations serve the area, including WHLM, WMMZ, and WCFT-FM. The town is primarily served by Service Electric Cable TV and receives both the Wilkes-Barre/Scranton market television stations and Philadelphia stations.

Infrastructure

Transportation

Bloomsburg Municipal Airport is in the southeast corner of Bloomsburg, along the Susquehanna River.

The main highways in Bloomsburg are U.S. Route 11, Pennsylvania Route 42 (serves the Bloomsburg Fairgrounds) and Pennsylvania Route 487. Interstate 80 passes north of the town, with access from Exit 232 (PA 42) to the northwest of town and Exit 236 (PA 487) northeast of town. US 11 leads west  to Danville and east  to Berwick, both on the Susquehanna River. PA 42 leads northwest  to Millville and south  to Ashland, while PA 487 leads northeast  to Benton and southwest  to Elysburg.

Utilities
PPL Corporation in Allentown provides electricity to Bloomsburg. Natural gas in the town is provided by UGI Penn Natural Gas. Cable television in Bloomsburg is provided by Service Electric Cable and CATV Service. Water in the town is provided by United Water PA.

Notable people
Lacy J. Dalton, country music singer-songwriter
Paul Hartzell, baseball player
Sean Panikkar, opera singer
Carl Risch, Assistant Secretary of State for Consular Affairs within the U.S. Department of State
Krysten Ritter, actress
Dan Washburn, writer
Benny Montgomery, baseball player

References

External links

 Town of Bloomsburg official website
 Columbia Montour Chamber of Commerce
 

 Towns in Pennsylvania
 Pennsylvania populated places on the Susquehanna River
 County seats in Pennsylvania
 Populated places established in 1797
 Bloomsburg–Berwick metropolitan area
 Populated places in Columbia County, Pennsylvania
1797 establishments in Pennsylvania